A suicide attempt is an attempt to die by suicide that results in survival. It may be referred to as a "failed" or "unsuccessful" suicide attempt, though these terms are discouraged by mental health professionals for implying that a suicide resulting in death is a successful and positive outcome.

Epidemiology 

In the United States, the National Institute of Mental Health reports there are 11 nonfatal suicide attempts for every suicide death. The American Association of Suicidology reports higher numbers, stating that there are 25 suicide attempts for every suicide completion. The ratio of suicide attempts to suicide death is about 25:1 in youths, compared to about 4:1 in elderly. A 2008 review found that nonfatal self-injury is more common in women, and a separate study from 2008/2009 found suicidal thoughts higher among females, as well as significant differences between genders for suicide planning and suicide attempts.

Suicide attempts are more common among adolescents in developing countries than developed ones. A 12-month prevalence of suicide attempt in developing countries between 2003 and 2015 was reported as 17%.

Parasuicide and self-injury

Without commonly agreed-upon operational definitions, some suicidology researchers regard many suicide attempts as parasuicide (para=near) or self harm behavior, rather than "true" suicide attempts, as in lacking suicidal intent.

Methods
Some suicide methods have higher rates of lethality than others. The use of firearms results in death 90% of the time. Wrist-slashing has a much lower lethality rate, comparatively. 75% of all suicide attempts are by drug overdose, a method that is often thwarted because the drug is nonlethal, or is used at a nonlethal dosage. These people survive 97% of the time.

Repetition 
A nonfatal suicide attempt is the strongest known clinical predictor of eventual suicide. Suicide risk among self-harm patients is hundreds of times higher than in the general population. It is often estimated that about 10–15% of people who attempt suicide eventually die by suicide. The mortality risk is highest during the first months and years after the attempt: almost 1% of individuals who attempt suicide will die by suicide if the attempt is repeated within one year. Recent meta-analytic evidence suggests that the association between suicide attempt and suicidal death may not be as strong as it was thought before.

Outcomes 
Suicide attempts can result in serious and permanent injuries and/or disabilities. 700,000 (or more) Americans survive a suicide attempt each year. People who attempt either hanging or carbon monoxide poisoning and survive can face permanent brain damage due to cerebral anoxia. People who take a drug overdose and survive can face severe organ damage (e.g., liver failure). Individuals who jump from a height and survive may face irreversible damage to multiple organs, as well as the spine and brain.

While a majority sustain injuries that allow them to be released following emergency room treatment, a significant minority—about 116,000—are hospitalized, of whom 110,000 are eventually discharged alive. Their average hospital stay is 79 days. Some 89,000, 17% of these people, are permanently disabled.

Criminalization of attempted suicide 

Historically in the Christian church, people who attempted suicide were excommunicated because of the religiously polarizing nature of the topic. While previously criminally punishable, attempted suicide no longer is in most Western countries. It remains a criminal offense in most Islamic countries. In the late 19th century in Great Britain, attempted suicide was deemed to be equivalent to attempted murder and could be punished by hanging. In the United States, suicide is not illegal and almost no country in Europe currently considers attempted suicide to be a crime.

In India, attempted suicide was decriminalized by the Mental Healthcare Act, 2017, while Singapore removed attempted suicide from their criminal code in 2020; previously it had been punishable by up to one-year in prison.

Many other countries still prosecute suicide attempts. As of 2012, attempted suicide is a criminal offense in Uganda, and as of 2013, it is criminalized in Ghana.

Despite having its own laws, Maryland still reserves the right to prosecute people under the English Common laws that were in place when America declared independence in 1776. These laws were used to convict a man for attempted suicide in 2018, resulting in a three-year suspended sentence and two years of supervised probation.

See also
 International Survivors of Suicide Loss Day
 Suicidal ideation
 World Suicide Prevention Day

References

Attempt
Failure